Casa de Oro-Mount Helix is a census-designated place (CDP) in the East County region of San Diego County, California.

The CDP encompasses several unincorporated neighborhoods near the cities of El Cajon and La Mesa and the CDP of Spring Valley. Locations in the northern (Mount Helix) part of the CDP use La Mesa addresses, while locations in the southern (Casa de Oro) part use Spring Valley addresses. Informally, Casa de Oro is often considered to be a part of Spring Valley.

The population was 18,762 at the 2010 census, down from 18,874 at the 2000 census.

History

In 1872, after a scientist discovered a European snail (Cornu aspersum, formerly Helix aspersa) living on a small mountain, Rufus King Porter, the founder of what is now unincorporated Spring Valley, California, named the peak Mt. Helix. Then in 1885, the United States Postal Service rejected the use of two words for a post office name, so Rufus submitted just the name Helix and also became the first postmaster in Spring Valley; the Helix Post Office was operated out of his home.

Around this same time, Hubert Howe Bancroft came to the area. He began calling his property "Helix Farms." Bancroft hired workers to help develop Helix Farms, planting orchards and building structures for his ranch. By the early 1900s, Helix Farms was home to the largest olive ranch in southern California; some of the original olive trees can still be found today. Bancroft died in 1918, and eventually his family sold the property.

Geography
Casa de Oro-Mount Helix is located at  (32.763359, -116.977474).

Demographics

2011
The 2010 United States Census reported that Casa de Oro-Mount Helix had a population of 18,762. The racial makeup of Casa de Oro-Mount Helix was 13,375 (64.6%) White, 1,108 (5.9%) African American, 89 (0.5%) Native American, 593 (3.2%) Asian, 96 (0.5%) Pacific Islander, 996 (5.3%) from other races, and 999 (5.3%) from two or more races. Hispanic or Latino of any race were 4,815 persons (23.3%).

The Census reported that 18,563 people (98.9% of the population) lived in households, 110 (0.6%) lived in non-institutionalized group quarters, and 89 (0.5%) were institutionalized.

There were 6,943 households, out of which 2,179 (31.4%) had children under the age of 18 living in them, 4,036 (58.1%) were opposite-sex married couples living together, 745 (10.7%) had a female householder with no husband present, 360 (5.2%) had a male householder with no wife present. There were 365 (5.3%) unmarried opposite-sex partnerships, and 77 (1.1%) same-sex married couples or partnerships. 1,319 households (19.0%) were made up of individuals, and 617 (8.9%) had someone living alone who was 65 years of age or older. The average household size was 2.67. There were 5,141 families (74.0% of all households); the average family size was 3.02.

The population was spread out, with 3,945 people (21.0%) under the age of 18, 1,510 people (8.0%) aged 18 to 24, 3,807 people (20.3%) aged 25 to 44, 6,012 people (32.0%) aged 45 to 64, and 3,488 people (18.6%) who were 65 years of age or older. The median age was 45.4 years. For every 100 females, there were 95.8 males. For every 100 females age 18 and over, there were 93.6 males.

The homeowner vacancy rate was 1.4%; the rental vacancy rate was 5.2%. 13,358 people (71.2% of the population) lived in owner-occupied housing units and 5,205 people (27.7%) lived in rental housing units.

2000
As of the census of 2000, there were 18,874 people, 7,012 households, and 5,287 families residing in the CDP. The population density was 2,760.1 inhabitants per square mile (1,065.4/km2). The racial makeup of the CDP was 68.7% White, 7.4% African American, 0.6% Native American, 2.5% Asian, 0.3% Pacific Islander, 4.2% from other races, and 4.0% from two or more races. Hispanic or Latino of any race were 17.2% of the population.

There were 7,012 households, out of which 30.4% had children under the age of 18 living with them, 61.4% were married couples living together, 9.8% had a female householder with no husband present, and 24.6% were non-families. 17.5% of all households were made up of individuals, and 7.7% had someone living alone who was 65 years of age or older. The average household size was 2.67 and the average family size was 2.99.

In the CDP, the population was spread out, with 23.0% under the age of 18, 7.7% from 18 to 24, 24.7% from 25 to 44, 27.8% from 45 to 64, and 16.9% who were 65 years of age or older. The median age was 42 years. For every 100 females, there were 95.2 males. For every 100 females age 18 and over, there were 93.6 males.

The median income for a household in the CDP was $60,387, and the median income for a family was $72,127. Males had a median income of $51,234 versus $31,923 for females. The per capita income for the CDP was $33,565. About 5.0% of families and 7.5% of the population were below the poverty line, including 8.7% of those under age 18 and 4.4% of those age 65 or over.

Education
Public high school education is provided by the Grossmont Union High School District. Elementary and middle schools are run by the La Mesa-Spring Valley School District.

Government

References

Census-designated places in San Diego County, California
East County (San Diego County)
Populated places established in 1885
1885 establishments in California
Census-designated places in California